Between the 5th and 12th centuries, an Irish sept claiming descent from Coirpre mac Néill ruled a barony of north Tethbae, called Cairpre Gabra. Their territory corresponds to the barony of Granard in modern county Longford in Ireland.

Etymology
Coirpre mac Néill (Modern ) was eldest son of the Niall of the Nine Hostages the supposed ancestor of the southern Uí Néill. Tradition claims Coirpre married a Fir Bolg princess named Mulreany and ruled all of North Longford from the Moat of Granard. Coirpre also owned tracts near Lough Erne and the Carbury barony in Sligo. The first Uí Néill successes in Leinster were probably due to this Coirpre, supposedly a high king of Ireland.

Ó Duígeannáin stated Cairbre Gabhra is identical to the ancient place "" disagreeing with O'Donovan's identification as "Carbury (County Kildare barony)".

Tuath Glasraige & Brecraighi
The territory was presumably a frontier colony of the Kingdom of Meath before the seventh century. An ancient folklore called "" named "the ” as ruling the territory around Granard and Lough Sheelin ("") but nothing further is known about the tribe.  Bracan mac Máine Mór probably resided at Rathbracken townland to the north of Granard. His descendants, the "", were defeated by the Cenél Coirpri in AD 751.

Cairpre Gabra
Between the fifth and seventh centuries, a branch of the Uí Néill called the Cairpre Gabhra ( - descendants of  Coirpre mac Néill) settled around Granard and Lough Sheelin in North Tethbae (approximately county Longford). Three distinct sub-septs of the Cenel Coirpri listed in the genealogies were powerful circa 700AD, namely the "Cairpri Laigin", the "Cairpri Gabra", and "Cairpri Dromma Cliab" though current thinking now believes "Cairpri Laigin" was a later construct. Furthermore, various related septs under the designations of Cenel Cairpre, Cairpre Mor, and Cairpre Gabra, figure in the annals of Ulster from the seventh, eighth, and ninth century. Cairpre Gabra is first mentioned in the Irish Annals for the year AD731. It is generally believed a larger Cairpre grouping stretched from Sligo to Longford at an early date taking in Leitrim and parts of Fermanagh (Tuatha Ratha or Magheraboy) and it was divided in two by the expansion of the Kingdom of Breifne under the Uí Briúin.

Cairpre Gabra lay between the tuaths of Luigne-Gailenga to the east, and Conmaicne Maigh Rein to the north-west.  Centred on Granard, Cairpre Gabra lay along the northern border of the ancient Kingdom of Meath, and comprised the barony of Granard, and at least part of the barony of Longford. Cairbre may have extended as far east as Cúl (Coole) in county Westmeath). The north-western frontier ran from Cluain Cusa (Clooncoose) through Crott (between Slieve Carbry and Lake Naback) over as far as Lough Gowna, but excluded the most northern portion of the modern barony of Granard. The Cairpre territory was probably of limited extent by the 8th century.

The principal churches were at Granard and Clonbroney, supposedly given to Saint Patrick when he visited "Coirpre" and instructed Guasacht mac Milchu to found a church at Granard, and two sisters, Emers, to found a church at Cluain Brónaigh (ClonBroney). Cairbre Gabra was therefore among the first Christianity centres in Ireland.

Cairpre Gabra was not a strong tuath and in the 11th century the O'Cairbres were conquered by the Ó Cuinns, Ó Fearghails, and other Conmhaícne tribes.  Caipre Gabra was absorbed into the larger Annaly kingdom, so named after "" the great-grandfather of Fearghail O'Farrell. Annaly became Longphoirt, now Longford, after O'Farrell's fortress of this name.

It is believed a section of the dynasty were introduced as lords of Carbury in Kildare in a 12th-century intrusion following this pressure on their original territory in north-east Longford. Ó Ciardha (O'Keary or O'Carey) were established as lords of Carbury from this group about the time of the Norman invasion of Ireland.

Events
Dobbs (1938, 1941) summarizes many events connected to the ancient Granard (barony) and Cairbre Gabra as follows-

 A Prehistoric Battle of Cluain Cuas (Clooncose) was won by Tigernmas.
 AD 236 Cormac mac Airt defeated the Ulstermen at Granard.
 AD 581 Aed mac Brenann mac Briun mac Máine Mór, king of Tethba, helped Saint Columcille and the northern Uí Neill decisively defeat the Meath Uí Neill at the battle of Cúl Uinnsin, at the south end of Lough Gowna in Coirpre Gabra.  The  Geas on the Kings of Tara "" might originate from this defeat.
 AD 751 The "" descendants of Eogan mac Bracan mac Máine Mór and "kings of the Brecraighi" were annihilated by the Cenél Coirpri at "Kilfintan" (5 km south of Granard).
 AD 927 Ua Ruairc raided Cairbre and Taebata killing Ua Ciarrdha, the lord of Cairbre Gabhra.
 AD 983  Brian Boru raided the western Kingdom of Meath and likely attacked Cairbre Gabra.
 AD 992 Maelruanaidh Ua Ciardha, king of Cairbre, was killed by the men of Tethba.
 AD 1012 Cairbre Gabhra were involved in a raid on the Gailenga in Cavan and the Kingdom of Meath. Pursued home, Ualgharg Ua Ciardha, lord of Cairbre, and many others were killed.
 AD 1046 Ua Ciardha, lord of Cairbre Gabhra, was killed by the lord of Tethba (Ua Flannagain of Comar).
 AD 1066 Many of the Cairbre Gabhra were slaughtered probably in revenge for plundering Scrin Choluimchille (Skreen in County Meath).
 AD 1069 Cairpre Gabhra and the church of Granard were burnt by the lord of Fine-gall, possibly in revenge for the burnings of Lusk and Swords churches the previous year.
 AD 1070 The men of Tethba were defeated by Ua Ruairc of Breifne.
 AD 1184 Cairpre Gabra disappear as an individual principality following the Norman invasion.

See also
 Tethbae
 Granard (barony)
 Gailenga
 Annaly

References and notes

Notes

Citations

Primary references

Secondary references

 

Gaels
History of County Longford
Kingdoms of medieval Ireland
Geography of County Longford